SNAP-94847 is a drug used in scientific research, which is a selective, non-peptide antagonist at the melanin concentrating hormone receptor MCH1. In animal studies it has been shown to produce both anxiolytic and antidepressant effects, and also reduces food consumption suggesting a possible anorectic effect.

References

4-Phenylpiperidines
Antidepressants
Anxiolytics
Anorectics
Fluoroarenes
Phenol ethers
Carboxamides
Anilides